Gwandalan is a suburb of the Central Coast region of New South Wales, Australia, located on a peninsula extending northwards into Lake Macquarie. It is part of the  local government area.

Population
According to the 2016 census of Population, there were 3,273 people in Gwandalan.
 Aboriginal and Torres Strait Islander people made up 5.6% of the population. 
 86.0% of people were born in Australia and 92.2% of people spoke only English at home. 
 The most common responses for religion were Catholic 28.7%, No Religion 27.3% and Anglican 24.2%.

Name
The name Gwandalan is derived from the Aboriginal for restful place.

School
Gwandalan Public School is the only school in Gwandalan. Most Gwandalan Public School students go to Lake Munmorah High School as it is the closest secondary school.

References

External links
 History of Gwandalan

Suburbs of the Central Coast (New South Wales)